Urban Geography is a peer-reviewed academic journal that was first published in 1980. It appears ten times per year and covers topics concerning urban policy and planning, race, poverty, ethnicity in urban areas, housing, and provision of services and urban economic activity.

Urban Geography was published by Bellwether Publishing Ltd. until 2013, when it was acquired by Taylor & Francis Group. It is available online and in print.

External links
 Taylor & Francis - Urban Geography

Geography journals
Urban studies and planning journals
Taylor & Francis academic journals